Elsa Werth (born 1985) is a French artist who lives and works in Paris.

Biography
Elsa Werth was born in 1985 in Paris, France. She graduated from both the École Nationale Supérieure des Arts Décoratifs where she studied film animation and École nationale supérieure des Beaux-Arts. She was awarded the price Humankind Leo Burnet in 2013 and the 23rd Pernod Ricard Foundation Prize for contemporary art in 2022.

Work
Elsa Werth practice includes installation, sculpture, video, artist's books, and sound pieces. She has exhibited since 2013 in France, U.S., China, Belgium, Germany, Luxembourg and Switzerland.

Her work focuses on the use of common objects and gestures, systems, language, traditional and contemporary rituals. The interpretation of information and commodity production, their relations to the social circles, are the key approaches to her projects. She uses alternative modes of exchange and expression to contradict a world she considers subject to the cult of material values. Her works are always made with simple means to escape spectacular effects.

In 2014 she has curated with Muriel Leray inside a storage unit in Paris Plus une pièce. Since 2016 she curates Potential Visual Evocations, an ongoing outdoor traveling exhibition that took place in Paris, Clichy, Shanghai, Montreal, La Louvière and Seoul. Participating artists include Claude Closky, Seulgi Lee and Marylène Negro among others.

Collections 

Selected exhibitions

Solo exhibitions
 Titre un à usages multiples, Lendroit, Rennes, 2022
 Give and Take, Bloom, Düsseldorf, 2022
 Parties de cartes, Saint-Yriex-la-Perche, 2021
 Blow: Elsa Werth, Bloom, Düsseldorf, 2020
 A Land,  mfc – Michèle Didier, Paris, 2020
 Anywayland, Interface, Dijon, 2019
 Temps Partiel [Part-Time], Onde Art Center, Vélizy-Villacoublay, 2019
 L'action cesse, Duplex Walden, Geneva, 2018
 Temporary Perspectives, Martine Aboucaya Gallery, Paris
 Title One for Multiple Use, Bazaar Compatible Program, Shanghai, 2016
 Title One for Multiple Use, Martine Aboucaya Gallery, Paris, 2016
 Elsa Werth, Primo Piano, Paris, 2014

Group exhibitions 

 Horizones, curated by Clément Dirié, 2022
 3 Collectionneurs #8, Été 78, Brussels, 2021
 Helix, Bloom, Düsseldorf, curated by Ji Sue Byun, 2021

 Nous irons tous au paradis, Frac Normandie – Caen, curated by Anne Cartel, 2021
Tout un film!, Drawing Lab, Paris, curated by Joana P.R. Neves, 2021
X, Frac Pays de la Loire, Carquefou, curated by Claude Closky, 2020
Some of Us, NordArt – Kunst in der Carlshütte, Büdelsdorf, curated by Jérôme Cotinet-Alphaize and Marianne Derrien, 2019
 Pourquoi faire, pour quoi faire, Été 78, Brussels, curated by Renato Casciani, 2019
 Calculated Chance, The Société, Brussels, curated by Manuel Abendroth et Els Vermang, 2019
 ShipShape, Biennale de Coimbra, curated by Tomas Cunha Ferreira, 2019
 Tilt Horizon 偏见, AMNUA, Nanjing, curated by Wang Yamin, 2019
 26 x Bauhaus, Institut Français, Berlin, 2019, curated by Marjolaine Lévy and Thibaut de Ruyter, 2019
 One Minute One Hour One Month... One Million Years, The Island Club Limassol, curated by Christodoulos Panayiotou, 2019
 Le génie du lieu, Le Creux de l’Enfer, Thiers, curated by Sophie Auger-Grappin, 2018
 Potential Visual Evocations, Darling Foundry, Montreal, 2018
 Phantoms, Wonder/Liebert, Bagnolet, curated by Karin Schlageter, 2018
 Artist-fun space, Art Center André Malraux, Douarnenez, curated by Julien Nédélec, 2018
 Flatland / Abstractions Narratives, Mudam, Luxembourg, 2017
 Sentimental Summer, Centre d’Art Bastille (CAB), Grenoble, 2017
 La vie mode d’emploi, CAC Chanot, Clamart, curated by Madeleine Mathé and Karin Schlageter, 2017
 Do Disturb, Palais de Tokyo, Paris, 2017
 Rob is a Robe, Doc, Paris, 2016 
 60ème Salon de Montrouge, Montrouge, 2015
 Bazar, Primo Piano, Paris, curated by Lucia Schreyer, 2015
 Cocktail Games, La Ludothèque éphémère, Paris, curated by Florencia Chernajovsky and Clément Dirié, 2015
 Châteaux de cartes, Florence Loewy...by artists, Paris, curated by Camille Azaïs, 2015
 Intertidal, Galerie Eva Meyer, Paris, curated by MBDTCurators, 2015
 Modifications, Zentrum für Kunst und Urbanistik (ZK/U), Berlin, 2014
 Toujours +, Florence Loewy...by artists, Paris, 2014
 5/5, Fondation Rosenblum, Paris, curated by Clément Dirié, 2013
 Marler Media Art Award, Marl, curated by Georg Elben, 2013

Selected books
 Plus une pièce, Plus un multiple, 2014, 
 Sparkless, 2015, 
 Original soldé, 2018, 
 Formule de politesse, 2019,  
 2020, 2020, 
 Politeness, 2020, 
 Un jour dans Le Monde (4 octobre 2019), 2020, 
 Negociation, 2021,  ISBN 979-10-94645-08-6
 Meeting Point, 2022, ISBN 979-10-94645-08-6

 Abracadabra'', 2022, ISBN 978-2-9602786-1-3

References

External links
 Potential Visual Evocations website
 Elsa Werth, Artext

1985 births
Living people
21st-century French women artists
French contemporary artists
École nationale supérieure des arts décoratifs alumni
École des Beaux-Arts alumni
French video artists
French mixed-media artists
Feminist artists
Artists from Paris
20th-century French women